Boris Sagal (October 18, 1923 – May 22, 1981) was an American television and film director.

Early life and career
Born in Yekaterinoslav, Ukrainian SSR (now known as Dnipro, Ukraine) to a Ukrainian-Jewish family, Sagal immigrated to the United States. Sagal's  TV credits include directing episodes of The Twilight Zone, T.H.E. Cat, Alfred Hitchcock Presents, Night Gallery, Columbo: Candidate for Crime, Peter Gunn, and The Man from U.N.C.L.E.. He also directed the 1972 television adaptation of Percy MacKaye's play The Scarecrow, for PBS. He was nominated for four Primetime Emmy Awards for his direction of the miniseries Rich Man, Poor Man and, posthumously, Masada.

Sagal directed the 1971 science fiction film The Omega Man, starring Charlton Heston in the lead role, and The Dream Makers.

There is a directing fellowship in his name at the Williamstown Theatre Festival in Massachusetts.

Shortly before his death, Sagal's miniseries Masada aired on ABC.

Personal life
Sagal was Ukrainian-Jewish. He was the father of Katey, Joey, David, Jean and Liz with his first wife, Sara Zwilling, who died in 1975. Norman Lear, who was a friend of Boris and was also made godfather to Katey, introduced Boris and Sara when Sara was his script supervisor while he wrote for The Martin and Lewis Show, as both Katey and Norman acknowledged in 2016. His second wife was Marge Champion, to whom he was married from January 1, 1977, until his death.

Death
Sagal was killed in an accident during production of the miniseries World War III, when he was partially decapitated by walking into the tail rotor blades of a helicopter in the parking lot of the Timberline Lodge in Oregon.  An investigation revealed that he turned the wrong way after exiting the helicopter. He died five hours later in a Portland hospital.

He is buried at Forest Lawn Memorial Park.

See also
List of unusual deaths

References

External links

1923 births
1981 deaths
Accidental deaths in Oregon
American film directors
American television directors
American television producers
Burials at Forest Lawn Memorial Park (Hollywood Hills)
Deaths by decapitation
Film people from Dnipro
Yale University alumni
Yale School of Drama alumni
Soviet emigrants to the United States
American people of Ukrainian-Jewish descent
Soviet Jews
Victims of aviation accidents or incidents in 1981
Victims of helicopter accidents or incidents in the United States
20th-century American businesspeople